The Alet is a river in southwestern France. The river is a right tributary of the Salat. The Alet is part of the Garonne basin.

References

Rivers of France
Rivers of Ariège (department)
Rivers of Occitania (administrative region)